Émilie Gladwys Andéol (born 30 October 1987) is a French judoka competing in the women's +78 kg division.  She won a gold medal at the 2014 European Judo Championships in Montpellier, and a bronze medal at the 2014 World Judo Championships in Chelyabinsk. She won the gold medal at the 2016 Summer Olympics in Rio de Janeiro.

References

External links
 

1987 births
Living people
French female judoka
European Games gold medalists for France
European Games medalists in judo
Sportspeople from Bordeaux
Olympic judoka of France
Medalists at the 2016 Summer Olympics
Judoka at the 2016 Summer Olympics
Olympic gold medalists for France
Olympic medalists in judo
Universiade medalists in judo
Universiade bronze medalists for France
Judoka at the 2015 European Games
21st-century French women